The James A. Judie House, also known as the Judie-Olmsted House, is a historic home located at South Bend, St. Joseph County, Indiana.  It was designed by Austin & Shambleau and was built in 1930.  It is a -story, Tudor Revival style brick dwelling with half-timbering and limestone trim.  It has a slate hipped roof.

It was listed on the National Register of Historic Places in 1983.

References

Houses on the National Register of Historic Places in Indiana
Tudor Revival architecture in Indiana
Houses completed in 1930
Houses in South Bend, Indiana
National Register of Historic Places in St. Joseph County, Indiana